In Japan's electricity sector, wind power generates a small proportion of the country's electricity. It has been estimated that Japan has the potential for 144 gigawatts (GW) for onshore wind and 608 GW of offshore wind capacity.
As of 2020, the country had a total installed capacity of 4.2 GW.

As of 2018, government targets for wind power deployment were relatively low when compared to other countries, at 1.7% of electricity production by 2030.

In December 2020, the Japanese government announced plans to install up to 45 GW of offshore wind power by 2040.

Statistics

Government regulation and incentives 
, the feed-in tariff per kWh are 21 yen for onshore and 36 yen for offshore.

In April 2019 the Renewable Sea Area Utilization Law came into force. The Act is expected to promote offshore wind power projects by providing for long-term use of certain sea areas for offshore wind power projects based on a bidding process.

In 2020, a new feed-in premium scheme was passed. It comes into force in April 2022 and provides for premiums to be paid to electricity providers in addition to market prices achieved on the power market.

McKinsey estimates that for every 1 GW of added offshore capacity, Japan saves more than $300 million in fuel imports.

Notable projects 

The Shin Izumo Wind Farm owned by Eurus Energy was the largest wind farm in Japan as of 2011, comprising 26 turbines with a total nameplate capacity of 78 megawatts.

The Shin Aoyama Wind Farm owned by C-tech is currently the largest wind farm in Japan, as of February 2018.  It comprises 40 turbines with a total nameplate capacity of 80 megawatts.  The amount of electrical power that can be generated is equivalent to the annual consumption of about 44,000 ordinary households.

The Yurihonjo Offshore Wind Farm located in Akita Prefecture is expected to begin construction in 2021. It will comprise 70-90 turbines with a proposed capacity of as much as 1000 megawatts. Upon completion, its capacity is projected to be the largest offshore wind farm in Japan.

In 2011, Japan stated plans to build a pilot floating wind farm, with six 2-megawatt turbines, off the Fukushima coast.  After the evaluation phase is complete in 2016, "Japan plans to build as many as 80 floating wind turbines off Fukushima by 2020."

In 2013, a floating offshore wind turbine was tested about 1 km off the coast of the island of Kabajima in Nagasaki Prefecture.  It was a part of a Japanese government test project.  This was the first of its kind in Japan.

In the second half of 2023, commissioning of the 340 MW Dohoku wind farm cluster on the island of Hokkaido using 79 typhoon-proof 4.3 MW onshore turbines is expected.

See also 

 Energy in Japan
 Geothermal power in Japan
 Hydroelectricity in Japan
 Solar power in Japan
 List of offshore wind farms in Japan
 Renewable energy by country

References

External links 

 Japan Wind Power Association 
 Japan Wind Energy Association 
 New Energy Foundation 
 New Energy and Industrial Technology Development Organization 
 Electrical Japan: Google Maps of Power Stations (Wind) 

 
Japan